Dan Gawrecki (born 23 December 1943 in Frýdek) is a Czech historian focusing mostly on Silesian history. He is professor since 2006.

Books
Politické a národnostní poměry v Těšínském Slezsku 1918–1938. Český Těšín 1999
Dějiny Českého Slezska I–II. Opava 2003 (co-author)
Historia Górnego Śląska. Gliwice 2011 (co-author)
Jazyk a národnost ve sčítáních lidu na Těšínsku v letech 1880–1930. Český Těšín: Muzeum Těšínska, 2017.

Articles
Der Schlesische Landtag. In: Die Habsburgermonarchie 1848–1918. Band VII. Verfassung und Parliamentarismus. Wien 2000, pp. 2105–2130.
Mečislav Borák – historik Těšínska. Těšínsko, 43, 2005, Vol. 1, pp. 29–32.
Polské politické strany. In: Politické strany 1861–1865. Vývoj politických stran a hnutí v českých zemích a Československu. Brno 2005, pp. 495–510.
Politické strany polské menšiny. In: Politické strany 1861–1865. Vývoj politických stran a hnutí v českých zemích a Československu. Brno 2005, pp. 943–956.
Józef Chlebowczyk a česká historiografie. In: Józef Chlebowczyk – badacz procesów narodotwórczych XIX i XX wieku. Katowice 2007, pp. 75–91.
Těšínsko o letech 1783–1938. Těšínsko 2007, Vol. 4, pp. 11–17.
Tschechische Historiker und ihr Anteil an den Vorbereitungsarbeiten am Buch Geschichte Oberschlesiens. Germanoslavica, Zeitschrift für germano-slawische Studien, 18, 2007, Vol. 1-2, pp. 181–187.
Granice i zmiany przynależności Śląska Cieszyńskiego. In: Śląsk Cieszyński – granice, przynależność – tożsamość. Cieszyn, Muzeum Śląska Cieszyńskiego 2008, pp. 15–24.

References

External links
 Information from the webpage of Opole University

1943 births
Living people
20th-century Czech historians
Palacký University Olomouc alumni
People from Frýdek-Místek
21st-century Czech historians